The Taiwan Hinoki Museum is a museum about hinoki trees in West District, Chiayi City, Taiwan.

History
The museum building was originally a timber factory. The director then renovated the factory building by adding new elements to create a quality brand with good standing.

Features
 Taiwan hinoki essential oil
 Taiwan hinoki treasure bowl
 Taiwan hinoki spa aromatherapy cream

Transportation
The museum is accessible within walking distance west from Chiayi Station of Taiwan Railways.

See also
 List of museums in Taiwan

References

External links

 

Museums with year of establishment missing
Natural history museums in Taiwan
Museums in Chiayi
West District